El Houssaine Ouchla (born 1 December 1970 in Rabat) is a retired Moroccan football player. He started his career with FAR Rabat, making his debut in 1990. He joined Moghreb Tétouan in 2006 but returned to FAR Rabat for the 2008-09 season. After one season with Association Salé he retired from playing.

Ouchla was selected by Morocco for the 2006 Africa Cup of Nations, but never made a full international appearance. He was also selected for the Morocco squad in the 2000 Olympic Games and made three appearances in the tournament.

References

1970 births
Living people
Moroccan footballers
Footballers from Rabat
Association football defenders
AS FAR (football) players
Association Salé players
Moghreb Tétouan players
Olympic footballers of Morocco
Footballers at the 2000 Summer Olympics